Pribor may refer to:
Příbor - a town in the Moravian-Silesian Region of the Czech Republic
Pribor-ZB - a Russian assault rifle
PRIBOR (rate) - Prague Interbank Offered Rate, a reference rate quoted in CZK